HMS Theseus /ˈtʰeː.seu̯s/, [ˈt̪ʰeːs̠ɛu̯s̠] (R64) was a  light fleet aircraft carrier of the Royal Navy. She was laid down in 1943 by Fairfield at Govan, and launched on 6 July 1944. She was involved in the Korean War and the Suez Crisis. Theseus was broken up in 1962.

The name Theseus comes from a mythical king and founder-hero of Athens.

Service history

Work-up and initial service

Theseus was laid down to serve in the Second World War, but was not completed before peace was declared in 1945. She was utilised as a training vessel until the outbreak of the Korean War.

In 1946, Theseus embarked on work-up and embarked aircraft, conducted trials, and a further work-up for operational service. After preparation for duty in the Far East, she sailed to join the British Pacific Fleet at Singapore as Flagship for the Flag Officer Air, Far East. In 1947, she deployed as the Flagship, 1st Aircraft Carrier Squadron with the British Pacific Fleet. On return to the UK she was refitted for service in the Home Fleet. On completion, she joined the 3rd Aircraft Carrier Squadron, Home Fleet.

Korean War
In 1950, with the beginning of the Korean War, Theseus was deployed to Korea, commencing standard carrier operations. Her first operation involved suppressing enemy defences and communications at Chinnampo, among other locations. Her second operational patrol involved only Combat Air Patrols (CAP), because her take-off weight capacity was limited by a dysfunctional catapult, and thus aircraft were unable to be armed with rockets and bombs. Her third operational duty was as part of a Commonwealth Task Force. Theseus sailed with accompanying ships from Sasebo in Japan. The carrier's aircraft launched successful air strikes on bridges, North Korean troops and other opportune targets, mainly concentrating on the Chinnampo area, resulting in chaos and heavy damage.

During her fourth operational patrol, which began in the middle of December 1950, aircraft from Theseus sighted and fired on numerous land vehicles in the north of the separated country, in what was a typical winter scene, with heavy snow covering the area. The destruction was extensive with many vehicles being destroyed. Soon afterwards, Chinese troops became the target of heavy attacks from the carrier's aircraft, which after the end of their fourth tour had completed over 1,630 hours in the air and fired over 1,400 rockets.

The next year, on 5 January 1951, Theseus commenced her fifth operational patrol, supporting the American 25th Division, who were fighting south of Osan in South Korea. On 15 January, the milestone of 1,000 accident-free landings on the Theseus was achieved. The Carrier Air Group (CAG) were awarded the Boyd Trophy for a remarkable operational tour of duty that included many firsts for pilots and aircrew, not to mention the ship itself.

The sixth operational patrol, which commenced in late January, was interspersed with several major and minor accidents. On 26 January, an aircraft appeared almost to shudder, before spinning out of control and into the sea. The   made her way to the location of the crash but to no avail. A second aircraft was hit a number of times by anti-aircraft gunfire, forcing the pilot to ditch the aeroplane in a valley in an area near Tongduchon-ni. There he hid, awaiting rescue, for about ninety minutes. An American helicopter flew in and picked up the pilot, while other aircraft from Theseus flew a close-air patrol over the area. On 2 February, a Sea Fury burst a tyre while landing, straining the fuselage and bring the number of accident-free landings to an end at 1,463.

The seventh operational patrol started off badly when a squadron of Fairey Fireflies, after returning from a reconnaissance mission, experienced gun misfires, causing one fatality. Further similar missions were flown, as well as close air support for the U.S. IX Corps in the Wonju area.

The eighth operational patrol, beginning on 4 March 1951, saw much of the same, with patrols over the now-familiar area of Chinnampo to Kuhsa-Sung to create the illusion of an imminent amphibious assault. Two more crashes occurred, the first incurring no casualties, but the second proving fatal with an aircraft crashing while returning to Theseus.
 
The ninth operational patrol opened with the shooting down of another aircraft at Suwon on 24 March. Further reconnaissance and CAS missions were flown, including an attack on six enemy vessels.

On 10 April, two Sea Furies were attacked by American Corsairs in a friendly-fire incident. One Sea Fury was seriously damaged, the other, after much manoeuvring, escaped unhurt. Two other Sea Furies which were performing nearby reconnaissance duties heard the call for assistance. However, while on the way there, one was shot down, the pilot being taken prisoner. Another aircraft searching for the first was shot down by flak, but the pilot escaped capture.

Two more aircraft were shot down soon afterwards. The first landed only forty miles from the Theseus, damaged by flak and was soon rescued by helicopter. The second, hit by flak crashed into a paddy field then skidded into a dry river bed where it came under small arms fire from North Korean troops. The remaining aircraft from the flight acted as a RESCAP (Rescue Close Air Patrol) while a further two Sea Furies escorted a helicopter en route to the downed pilot's location. After thirty eight minutes, the pilot, severely injured, was rescued.

Further successful strikes were launched on numerous North Korean targets. During these strikes another aircraft from the carrier's flight complement was shot down. The downed pilot was rescued by an American helicopter pilot who was later awarded the Distinguished Service Cross for successfully carrying out a courageous rescue despite heavy small arms fire from North Korean troops. He was awarded the honor at the British Consulate in Seattle.

On 15 January 1952, the allied task force operations ended with departure of the American carrier Bataan. Theseus herself continued operations in Korea, this time on the west coast. An aircraft from Theseus was ditched due to engine failure, the pilot spending 55 minutes in a rough sea until being rescued. Two days later, operations from Theseus ended. Theseus was replaced by sister ship  and departed from Sasebo.

Naval-history.net records that in late 1951 Theseus joined the Home Fleet as Flagship, 2nd Aircraft Carrier Squadron. In 1952, she became Home Fleet Flagship, and then was detached to the Mediterranean to relieve Glory for service with the United Nations' effort off Korea. She took part in joint exercises in Mediterranean with Home Fleet ships. In February–March 1952, Theseus, with the 14th Carrier Air Group embarked, took part in the NATO Exercise Grand Slam in the Mediterranean.

In 1953 she took part in the Fleet Review to celebrate the Coronation of Queen Elizabeth II.

Suez Crisis and fate

From November to December, helicopters from Theseus transported troops ashore, as well as evacuating wounded soldiers. Compared to her actions during the Korean War, her role at Suez was relatively quiet. The following year she was placed in reserve. She was subsequently broken up at Inverkeithing in 1962.

References

Publications

External links

 Maritimequest HMS Theseus photo gallery

 

Colossus-class aircraft carriers
Ships built in Govan
1944 ships
Cold War aircraft carriers of the United Kingdom
Korean War aircraft carriers of the United Kingdom